Other People's Children is a 2015 American romantic drama film directed by Liz Hinlein and starring Diane Marshall-Green and Chad Michael Murray.  It is Hinlein's directorial debut.

Cast
Chad Michael Murray
Diane Marshall-Green
Michael Mosley
Harrison Thomas
Alexandra Breckenridge
Alyssa Diaz
Scott Patterson
Kate Luyben
Alex McKenna
Emily Button
Gattlin Griffith
Alison Sudol

Reception
On Rotten Tomatoes it received a 17% rating based on reviews from 6 critics.

References

External links
 

American romantic drama films
2015 directorial debut films
2015 films
2010s English-language films
2010s American films